Parma Associazione Calcio regained its respect following a lacklustre Serie A and Champions League performance the year before. Under new coach Cesare Prandelli, Parma played an offensive 4–3–3 formation, in which new offensive signings Adrian Mutu and Adriano starred. Both made up for the departure of Marco Di Vaio to Juventus. Mutu scored 18 goals from the left wing, and Parma accepted a multimillion-pound offer from Chelsea in the summer, which meant the Romanian international only spent a year at the club. Also impressing were goalkeeper Sébastien Frey and young centre-halves Matteo Ferrari and Daniele Bonera, who proved to be acceptable replacements for departed captain Fabio Cannavaro, who had joined Inter in late August 2002.

Parma finished fifth in Serie A and missed out on Champions League qualification to Lazio by four points. It had the upper hand on Udinese for fifth on goal difference, and was one point clear of Chievo in seventh. That solitary point qualified Parma for European football in 2003–04. Parma also spent part of pre-season playing in the 2002 Amsterdam Tournament.

Players

Squad information

Transfers

Winter

Competitions

Supercoppa Italiana

Serie A

League table

Results summary

Results by round

Matches

Coppa Italia

Second round

UEFA Cup

First round

Second round

Statistics

Players statistics

Goalscorers

References

Parma Calcio 1913 seasons
Parma